Harmanpreet Singh (born 2 September 2001) is an Indian professional footballer who plays as a winger for Bengaluru FC in the Indian Super League.

Career 
Harmanpreet was signed by Indian Arrows from United Punjab FC. He made his professional debut for the Indian Arrows side against Punjab F.C. on 1 December 2018, He was brought in 86th minute as Indian Arrows lost 1–0.

East Bengal
In November 2020, Harmanpreet was signed by Indian Super League side East Bengal. He made his debut for the club on 3 January 2021 in a 3–1 win against Odisha as he came on as a substitute in the 72nd minute.

Bengaluru FC
It was announced on 18 July 2021 that Bengaluru FC had acquired him on a two year contract.

Career statistics

References

2001 births
Living people
Indian footballers
Indian Arrows players
Bengaluru FC players
Footballers from Punjab, India
I-League players
India youth international footballers
Association football forwards